Martyrs is a 2015 American horror film directed by Kevin and Michael Goetz and written by Mark L. Smith. The film stars Troian Bellisario, Bailey Noble and Kate Burton. It is a remake of Pascal Laugier's 2008 film of the same name.

The film had its world premiere at the Sitges Film Festival on October 9, 2015. It was released on January 22, 2016, by Anchor Bay Films.

Plot
As a child, Lucie Jurin escapes from a building where she has been held captive and tortured. Lucie spends the rest of her childhood at St. Mary's Orphanage, where she is haunted by hallucinations of a strange-looking creature that attempts to attack her at every turn. Over time, she grows extremely close to Anna Assaoui, a fellow resident at the orphanage and Lucie's only friend.

Ten years later, Lucie goes to the countryside home of the Patterson family with a shotgun and executes all four family members, believing them to be related to her childhood torture. Lucie calls Anna who is concerned that the family may not be responsible for Lucie's torture. Anna is horrified by the scene when she arrives at the house and calls 9-1-1 while Lucie sleeps but hangs up. Anna discovers Mrs. Patterson is still alive and tries to help her escape. Lucie suddenly tackles Mrs. Patterson outside and stabs her to death. While cleaning the crime scene, Anna finds a secret panel in a closet which leads to a hidden basement. Anna finds a little girl named Sam and rescues her. The two regroup with Lucie and safely make their exit from the basement when several trucks arrive with Eleanor, Fenton and several other people to give chase; after the pursuit, all three girls are soon captured and taken under custody.

Later, Anna is interrogated by Eleanor, who explains that her group is a collective dedicated to discovering what waits in the afterlife; by torturing women and young girls to their breaking point, they believe they can create Martyrs with an ability to glimpse briefly into "the other side". Giving Anna gratitude for bringing Lucie back, she values Lucie as a rare find, as she is capable of enduring great pain without dying. As an example, Eleanor has Anna watch from an overhead room as the cabal gathers to observe a captive woman being burned at the stake. After the woman dies, the priest overseeing her ordeal looks in Eleanor's direction and shakes his head. Lucie is taken for surgery and Eleanor orders the doctor to perform a procedure on Lucie. The doctor cuts and peels a piece of flesh from Lucie's back as part of the final preparations for her martyrdom.

Meanwhile, Anna is taken to a pit outside and buried alive for being Lucie’s accomplice but she digs her way into a drainage ditch and escapes. She fights her way back into the underground facility, killing several cabal members. She frees Sam and tells her to run for help. While she searches for Lucie, she is attacked by Fenton and shot in the shoulder but eventually kills him with the help of another captive woman. Anna gets stabbed in the side by one of the cabal members before shooting him.

Anna finds and interrupts an assembly gathered to watch Lucie die on a cross. Lucie gets a look in her eyes that the group feels signifies martyrdom and Anna, wielding Fenton's gun, insists that Lucie be freed. Lucie reveals what she saw in a whisper to Anna. Eleanor demands to know what Lucie said; the priest says he heard Lucie's whispers before quickly putting a gun in his mouth and killing himself. Anna shoots Eleanor and the rest of the cabal members flee. Anna embraces Lucie as they lie dying on the floor. With the police on their way, both women's eyes glaze over with the look of martyrdom.

Cast
 Troian Bellisario as Lucie Jurin 
 Ever Prishkulnik as Young Lucie 
 Bailey Noble as Anna Assaoui 
 Elyse Cole as Young Anna
 Caitlin Carmichael as Sam
 Romy Rosemont as Mrs. Patterson
 Toby Huss as Fenton
 Melissa Tracy as The Creature
 Kate Burton as Eleanor 
 Blake Robbins as Mr. Patterson 
 Taylor John Smith as Son 
 Lexi DiBenedetto as Daughter 
 Diana Hopper as Sarah
 Ivar Brogger as Priest

Production
The project dates back to at least 2008 with the director of the original, Pascal Laugier, negotiating for the rights for an American remake. Daniel Stamm was set to direct at this time but later dropped out due to budgetary concerns. Specifically he worried about "plateauing", saying that "if you're a filmmaker who makes two movies in the same budget bracket, that becomes your thing. You are the guy for the $3 million movie, and then that's all you do", further elaborating that his agent advised him against making the film for this reason.

Screenwriter Mark L. Smith had stated that he tried to avoid showing as much of the violence on screen as possible which he stated resulted in "less about watching someone be tortured and more about trying to save a friend." he has stated that he chose this route because " it’s more just my taste." Early on Kristen Stewart was considered for a role, though her presence in the film was later denied by Stamm.

Release
Anchor Bay Entertainment acquired all North American rights for Martyrs from Wild Bunch after the film premiered at the 2015 Cannes Film Festival. The film was later screened at the Screamfest Horror Film Festival in Los Angeles in October 2015.

Reception
Martyrs was panned by critics. On Rotten Tomatoes it has an approval rating of 9% rating based on 33 reviews with an average of 3.53/10 with the consensus stating, "Martyrs flays off everything that gave the original its icy horrific beauty, leaving us with an empty, pointless remake". On Metacritic it has a score of 19 out of 100 based on 13 reviews, indicating "overwhelming dislike".

Kalyn Corrigan wrote that "aside from creating a much tamer version, the 2015 Martyrs headed by the Goetz brothers feels too similar to the first film, bordering on a shot-for-shot remake that doesn’t really bring anything new or worthwhile to the table in order to justify its existence".

Pascal Laugier’s response
When asked about the remake, original director Pascal Laugier responded, “I had a bad contract, I didn't even get paid for it! That's really the only thing I regret in my career: That my name is now associated with such a junk film and I didn't even get a cent for it! I tried to watch it but only got through 20 minutes. It was like watching my mother get raped! Then I stopped. Life is too short. In the American system, a movie like ‘Martyrs’ is just not possible - they saw my movie and then turned it into something completely uninteresting.”

See also
 List of films featuring home invasions

References

External links
 

2015 films
2015 horror films
American horror thriller films
Horror film remakes
Religious horror films
American remakes of French films
Films produced by Jason Blum
Blumhouse Productions films
Torture in films
Films produced by Wyck Godfrey
2010s English-language films
2010s American films